The 2020 National Football League, known for sponsorship reasons as the Allianz National Football League, is the 89th staging of the National Football League (NFL), an annual Gaelic football tournament for Gaelic Athletic Association county teams. Thirty-one county teams from the island of Ireland, plus London, compete. Kilkenny do not participate.

The league was originally scheduled to end in March 2020, but the public health measures introduced to combat the spread of the COVID-19 pandemic resulted in the final two league rounds being delayed to October. In June 2020 the GAA announced that the league finals would not be played with the division winners being determined by table position at the end of the league rounds. This was only the second NFL season to be decided without a final (the first was in 1935–36).

The GAA announced a new broadcast agreement on 10 January 2019 that runs from 2019 until 2022. Eir Sport and RTÉ provide live TV coverage of the league on Saturday nights. TG4 broadcast Sunday afternoon games. The highlights programmes are RTÉ2's League Sunday on Sunday evenings, TG4's GAA 2019 on Monday evenings and Eir Sport's Allianz Leagues Reloaded on Wednesday evenings.

London withdrew after Round 6 due to the impact of the COVID-19 pandemic on Gaelic games. A meeting was held on September 12.

On 24 October, Kerry became the Division 1 champions, with 11 points from their seven games.

Format

League structure
In the top division, Division 1, teams compete to become the National Football League (NFL) champions. The top two teams qualify for the NFL Final, with the winners crowned NFL champions.
The 2020 National Football League consists of four divisions of eight teams. Each team plays every other team in its division once. Two points are awarded for a win and one point for a draw.

Teams compete for promotion and relegation to a higher or lower league. In Divisions 2, 3 and 4, the first and second-places teams are promoted, while the bottom two teams of divisions 1, 2 and 3 are relegated. There is no relegation from Division 4.

Tiebreakers for league ranking
As per the Official GAA Guide - Part 1 - Section 6.21 -

If two teams in the same group are equal on points on completion of the league phase, the following tie-breaking criteria are applied:
Where two teams only are involved - the outcome of the meeting of the two teams in the previous game in the Competition;

If three or more teams in the same group are equal on points on completion of the league phase, the following tie-breaking criteria are applied:
Scoring Difference (subtracting the total scores against from total scores for);
Highest Total Score For;
A Play-Off.

In the event that two teams or more finish with equal points, but have been affected by a disqualification, loss of game on a proven objection, retirement or walkover, the tie shall be decided by the following means:
Score Difference from the games in which only the teams involved, (teams tied on points), have played each other. (subtracting the total Scores Against from total Scores For)
Highest Total Score For, in which only the teams involved, have played each other, and have finished equal in (i)
A Play-Off

Division 1

Table

Round 1

Round 2

Round 3

Round 4

Round 5

Round 6

Round 7

Division 2

Table

Round 1

Round 2

Round 3

Round 4

Round 5

Round 6

Round 7

Division 3

Table

Round 1

Round 2

Round 3

Round 4

Round 5

Round 6

Round 7

Division 4

Table

Round 1

Round 2

Round 3

Round 4

Round 5

Round 6

Round 7

League statistics

Top scorer: Overall

Top scorer: Single game

Scoring events

References

External links
 Full Fixtures and Results

 
National Football League
National League
National Football League (Ireland) seasons
National Football League